The Early Shakopee Houses are a pair of houses located at 411 and 419 East 2nd Avenue, Shakopee, Minnesota, United States. They are listed on the National Register of Historic Places.

The houses are built mainly of brick, which was quite common in Scott County, even for modest residential dwellings.  These two houses, as with other structures in Scott County, were designed by local builders, not by well-known architects, but they show the influence of major architectural styles as interpreted by area residents and builders.  The houses date back to about 1865, when the county was experiencing a phase of growth associated with the construction of railroads.  The Minnesota Valley Railroad, later part of the Chicago, St. Paul, Minneapolis and Omaha Railway, built its line through Shakopee in 1865.  Shakopee had been established as a river town in 1854, but the growth of railroad lines in the county accelerated Shakopee's growth.  The Merchants Hotel and these two houses in Shakopee, along with the Hooper–Bowler–Hillstrom House and the Episcopal Church of the Transfiguration in Belle Plaine and several buildings in the Jordan Historic District in Jordan, were nominated to the National Register as examples of the development in the railroad boom era in Scott County.

References

External links
 

Houses completed in 1865
Houses in Scott County, Minnesota
Houses on the National Register of Historic Places in Minnesota
National Register of Historic Places in Scott County, Minnesota